Jake Mullaney (born 28 May 1990) is an Australian professional rugby league footballer who has played in the 2000s and 2020s. He has been described as, "slightly built," and a, "prolific goal-kicker."

Early life
Mullaney grew up playing for Eaglevale St Andrews in NSW. Until in 2009 when he got the call up to play in the Wests Tigers under 20s side.

Club career

Wests Tigers (2009–11)
Mullaney made records in the Toyota Cup, scoring a then record 325 points in a season. In his first season (2009) he scored the most tries with 29 and the second most goals with 103. Despite his achievements, he was not offered a contract renewal from the Wests Tigers, with club favouring James Tedesco. Still, Mullaney was described as, "the best fullback to come out of Western Suburbs since Brett Hodgson."
In late 2011, the Parramatta Eels announced that Mullaney would be playing for them until 2013.

Parramatta Eels (2012–13)
On 8 July 2012 Rd 18, Mullaney made his NRL début for the Parramatta Eels against the Manly-Warringah Sea Eagles at Brookvale Oval. Scoring a try on début in Parramatta's 40-24 loss.  Mullaney spent two years at Parramatta with both seasons ending with the club finishing last and claiming the wooden spoon.

Bradford Bulls (2015)
Mullaney signed for Bradford on a 1 Year Deal. He featured in the pre-season friendlies against Castleford Tigers and Leeds Rhinos.

Mullaney featured in Round 1 (Leigh Centurions) to Round 6 (Workington Town) then in Round 11 (Sheffield Eagles). Mullaney played in Round 17 (Dewsbury Rams) to Round 18 (Workington Town) then in Round 20 (Hunslet Hawks) to Round 21 (Sheffield Eagles). Mullaney played in Qualifier 1 (Sheffield Eagles) and then in Qualifier 3 (Salford Red Devils) to Qualifier 4 (Widnes Vikings). Jake featured in Qualifier 6 (Leigh Centurions). Jake played in the £1 Million Game against Wakefield Trinity Wildcats. He also featured in the Challenge Cup in Round 4 (Workington Town). He scored against Leigh Centurions (2 tries), Hunslet Hawks (6 tries), Batley Bulldogs (1 try), Workington Town (3 tries), Sheffield Eagles (3 tries) and Salford Red Devils (2 tries, 1 drop goal).

He signed a 2-year extension with Bradford on 12 August 2015 however he was granted a release from the club to allow him to return to Australia for family reasons

Thirlmere Roosters
Mullaney captain-coached the Thirlmere Roosters to Group 6 Rugby League First Grade premierships in 2019 and 2020.

Career statistics

References

1990 births
Living people
Balmain Ryde-Eastwood Tigers players
Bradford Bulls players
Parramatta Eels players
Wentworthville Magpies players
Salford Red Devils players
Rugby league fullbacks
Rugby league halfbacks
Australian rugby league players
Rugby league players from Sydney